The Free Democratic Party (FDP) is a liberal political party in Germany.

The FDP was founded in 1948 by members of former liberal political parties which existed in Germany before World War II, namely the German Democratic Party and the German People's Party. For most of the second half of the 20th century, the FDP held the balance of power in the Bundestag. It has been a junior coalition partner to both the CDU/CSU (1949–1956, 1961–1966, 1982–1998 and 2009–2013) and Social Democratic Party of Germany (1969–1982, 2021–present). In the 2013 federal election, the FDP failed to win any directly elected seats in the Bundestag and came up short of the 5 percent threshold to qualify for list representation, being left without representation in the Bundestag for the first time in its history. In the 2017 federal election, the FDP regained its representation in the Bundestag, receiving 10.6% of the vote. After the 2021 federal election the FDP became part of governing Scholz cabinet in coalition with the Social Democratic Party of Germany and The Greens.

Since the 1980s, the party has pushed economic liberalism and has aligned itself closely to the promotion of free markets and privatization, and is aligned to the centre or centre-right of the political spectrum. The FDP is a member of the Liberal International, the Alliance of Liberals and Democrats for Europe and Renew Europe.

History

Predecessors 
The history of liberal parties in Germany dates back to 1861, when the German Progress Party (DFP) was founded, being the first political party in the modern sense in Germany. From the establishment of the National Liberal Party in 1867 until the demise of the Weimar Republic in 1933, the liberal-democratic camp was divided into a "national-liberal" and a "left-liberal" line of tradition. After 1918 the national-liberal strain was represented by the German People's Party (DVP), the left-liberal one by the German Democratic Party (DDP, which merged into the German State Party in 1930). Both parties played an important role in government during the Weimar Republic era, but successively lost votes during the rise of the Nazi Party beginning in the late-1920s. After the Nazi seizure of power, both liberal parties agreed to the Enabling Act of 1933 and subsequently dissolved themselves. During the 12 years of Hitler's rule, some former liberals collaborated with the Nazis (e.g. economy minister Hjalmar Schacht), while others resisted actively against Nazism, with some Liberal leaning members and former members of the military joining up with Henning von Tresckow (e.g. the Solf Circle).

Soon after World War II, the Soviet Union pushed for the creation of licensed "anti-fascist" parties in its occupation zone in East Germany. In July 1945, former DDP politicians Wilhelm Külz, Eugen Schiffer and Waldemar Koch called for the establishment of a pan-German liberal party. Their Liberal-Democratic Party (LDP) was soon licensed by the Soviet Military Administration in Germany, under the condition that the new party joined the pro-Soviet "Democratic Bloc".

In September 1945, citizens in Hamburg—including the anti-Nazi resistance circle "Association Free Hamburg"—established the Party of Free Democrats (PFD) as a bourgeois left-wing party and the first liberal Party in the Western occupation zones. The German Democratic Party was revived in some states of the Western occupation zones (in the Southwestern states of Württemberg-Baden and Württemberg-Hohenzollern under the name of Democratic People's Party).

Many former members of DDP and DVP however agreed to finally overcome the traditional split of German liberalism into a national-liberal and a left-liberal branch, aiming for the creation of a united liberal party. In October 1945 a liberal coalition party was founded in the state of Bremen under the name of Bremen Democratic People's Party. In January 1946, liberal state parties of the British occupation zone merged into the Free Democratic Party of the British Zone (FDP). A similar state party in Hesse, called the Liberal Democratic Party, was licensed by the U.S. military government in January 1946. In the state of Bavaria, a Free Democratic Party was founded in May 1946.

In the first post-war state elections in 1946, liberal parties performed well in Württemberg-Baden (16.8%), Bremen (18.3%), Hamburg (18.2%) and Greater Berlin (still undivided; 9.3%). The LDP was especially strong in the October 1946 state elections of the Soviet zone—the last free parliamentary election in East Germany—obtaining an average of 24.6% (highest in Saxony-Anhalt, 29.9%, and Thuringia, 28.5%), thwarting an absolute majority of the Socialist Unity Party of Germany (SED) that was favoured by the Soviet occupation power. This disappointment to the communists however led to a change of electoral laws in the Soviet zone, cutting the autonomy of non-socialist parties including the LDP and forcing it to join the SED-dominated National Front, making it a dependent "bloc party".

The Democratic Party of Germany (DPD) was established in Rothenburg ob der Tauber on 17 March 1947 as a pan-German party of liberals from all four occupation zones. Its leaders were Theodor Heuss (representing the DVP of Württemberg-Baden in the American zone) and Wilhelm Külz (representing the LDP of the Soviet zone). However, the project failed in January 1948 as a result of disputes over Külz's pro-Soviet direction.

Founding of the party 

The Free Democratic Party was established on 11–12 December 1948 in Heppenheim, in Hesse, as an association of all 13 liberal state parties in the three Western zones of occupation. The proposed name, Liberal Democratic Party, was rejected by the delegates, who voted 64 to 25 in favour of the name Free Democratic Party (FDP).

The party's first chairman was Theodor Heuss, a member of the Democratic People's Party in Württemberg-Baden; his deputy was Franz Blücher of the FDP in the British zone. The place for the party's foundation was chosen deliberately: the "Heppenheim Assembly" was held at the Hotel Halber Mond on 10 October 1847, a meeting of moderate liberals who were preparing for what would be, within a few months, the German revolutions of 1848–1849.

The FDP was founded on 11 December 1948 through the merger of nine regional liberal parties formed in 1945 from the remnants of the pre-1933 German People's Party (DVP) and the German Democratic Party (DDP), which had been active in the Weimar Republic.

1949–1969: reconstruction of Germany 

In the first elections to the Bundestag on 14 August 1949, the FDP won a vote share of 11.9 percent (with 12 direct mandates, particularly in Baden-Württemberg and Hesse), and thus obtained 52 of 402 seats. It formed a common Bundestag group with the hard-right Deutsche Partei (DP). In September of the same year the FDP chairman Theodor Heuss was elected the first President of the Federal Republic of Germany. In his 1954 re-election, he received the best election result to date of a President with 871 of 1018 votes (85.6 percent) of the Federal Assembly. Adenauer was also elected on the proposal of the new German President with an extremely narrow majority as the first Chancellor. The FDP participated with the CDU/CSU and the German Party in Adenauer's coalition cabinet: they had three ministers: Franz Blücher (Vice-Chancellor), Thomas Dehler (Justice) and Eberhard Wildermuth (housing).

On the most important economic, social and German national issues, the FDP agreed with their coalition partners, the CDU/CSU. However, the FDP offered to middle-class voters a secular party that refused the religious schools and accused the opposition parties of clericalization. The FDP said they were known also as a consistent representative of the market economy, while the CDU was then dominated nominally from the Ahlen Programme, which allowed a Third Way between capitalism and socialism. Ludwig Erhard, the "father" of the social market economy, had his followers in the early years of the Federal Republic in the CDU/CSU rather than in the FDP.

The FDP won Hesse's 1950 state election with 31.8 percent, the best result in its history, through appealing to East Germans displaced by the war by including them on their ticket.

Up to the 1950s, several of the FDP's regional organizations were to the right of the CDU/CSU, which initially had ideas of some sort of Christian socialism, and even former office-holders of the Third Reich were courted with nationalist values. The FDP voted in parliament at the end of 1950 against the CDU- and SPD-introduced de-nazification process. At their party conference in Munich in 1951 they demanded the release of all "so-called war criminals" and welcomed the establishment of the "Association of German soldiers" of former Wehrmacht and SS members to advance the integration of the Nazi forces in democracy. The FDP members were seen as part of the "extremist" block along with the German Party in West Germany by the US intelligence officials.

Similarly, a de-Nazification Act could only be passed at the end of 1950 in the Bundestag because the opposition SPD supported the motion along with the governing CDU/CSU; the governing FDP voted along with the hard-right DP and the openly neo-Nazi German Reich Party (DRP) against the law against Nazis.

The 1953 Naumann-Affair, named after Werner Naumann, identified old Nazis trying to infiltrate the party, which had many right-wing and nationalist members in Hesse, North Rhine-Westphalia and Lower Saxony. After the British occupation authorities had arrested seven prominent members of the Naumann circle, the FDP federal board installed a commission of inquiry, chaired by Thomas Dehler, which particularly sharply criticized the situation in the North Rhine-Westphalian FDP. In the following years, the right wing lost power, and the extreme right increasingly sought areas of activity outside the FDP. In the 1953 federal election, the FDP received 9.5 percent of the party votes, 10.8 percent of the primary vote (with 14 direct mandates, particularly in Hamburg, Lower Saxony, Hesse, Württemberg and Bavaria) and 48 of 487 seats.

In the second term of the Bundestag, the South German Liberal democrats gained influence in the party. Thomas Dehler, a representative of a more social-liberal course took over as party and parliamentary leader. The former Minister of Justice Dehler, who in 1933 suffered persecution by the Nazis, was known for his rhetorical focus. Generally the various regional associations were independent. After the FDP had left in early 1956, the coalition with the CDU in North Rhine-Westphalia and made with SPD and centre a new state government, were a total of 16 members of parliament, including the four federal ministers from the FDP and founded the short-lived Free People's Party, which then up was involved to the end of the legislature instead of FDP in the Federal Government. The FDP first took it to the opposition.

Only one of the smaller post-war parties, the FDP survived despite many problems. In 1957 federal elections they still reached 7.7 percent of the vote to 1990 and their last direct mandate with which they had held 41 of 497 seats in the Bundestag. However, they still remained in opposition because the Union won an absolute majority. The FDP also called for a nuclear-free zone in Central Europe.

Even before the election Dehler was assigned as party chairman. At the federal party in Berlin at the end January 1957 relieved him Reinhold Maier. Dehler's role as Group Chairman took over after the election of the national set very Erich Mende. Mende was also chairman of the party.

In the 1961 federal election, the FDP achieved 12.8 percent nationwide, the best result until then, and the FDP entered a coalition with the CDU again. Although it was committed before the election to continuing to sit in any case in a government together with Adenauer, Chancellor Adenauer was again, however, to withdraw under the proviso, after two years. These events led to the FDP being nicknamed the Umfallerpartei ("pushover party").

In the Spiegel Affair, the FDP withdrew their ministers from the federal government. Although the coalition was renewed again under Adenauer in 1962, the FDP withdrew again on the condition in October 1963. This occurred even under the new Chancellor, Ludwig Erhard. This was for Erich Mende turn the occasion to go into the cabinet: he took the rather unimportant Federal Ministry for All-German Affairs.

In the 1965 federal elections the FDP gained 9.5 percent. The coalition with the CDU in 1966 broke on the subject of tax increases and it was followed by a grand coalition between the CDU and the SPD. The opposition also pioneered a course change to: The former foreign policy and the attitude to the eastern territories were discussed. Opposition leader for the FDP in Bundestag was Knut von Kühlmann-Stumm. The new chairman elected delegates in 1968 Walter Scheel, a European-oriented liberals, although it came from the national liberal camp, but with Willi Weyer and Hans-Dietrich Genscher led the new center of the party. This center strove to make the FDP coalition support both major parties. Here, the Liberals approached to by their reorientation in East Germany and politics especially of the SPD.

1969–1982: social changes and crises 

On 21 October 1969 began the period after the election of a Social-Liberal coalition with the SPD and the German Chancellor Willy Brandt. Walter Scheel was he who initiated the foreign policy reversal. Despite a very small majority he and Willy Brandt sat by the controversial New Ostpolitik. This policy was within the FDP quite controversial, especially since after the entry into the Federal Government defeats in state elections in North Rhine-Westphalia, Lower Saxony and Saarland on 14 June 1970 followed. In Hanover and Saarbrücken, the party left the parliament.

After the federal party congress in Bonn, just a week later supported the policy of the party leadership and Scheel had confirmed in office, founded by Siegfried party rights Zoglmann 11 July 1970 a "non-partisan" organization called the National-Liberal action on the Hohensyburgstraße—to fall with the goal of ending the left-liberal course of the party and Scheel. However, this was not. Zoglmann supported in October 1970 a disapproval resolution of opposition to Treasury Secretary Alexander Möller, Erich Mende, Heinz Starke, and did the same. A little later all three declared their withdrawal from the FDP; Mende and Strong joined the CDU, Zoglmann later founded the German Union (Deutsche Union), which remained a splinter party.

The foreign policy and the socio-political changes were made in 1971 by the Freiburg theses, which were as Rowohlt Paperback sold more than 100,000 times, on a theoretical basis, the FDP is committed to "social liberalism" and social reforms. Walter Scheel was first foreign minister and vice chancellor, 1974, he was then second-liberal President and paving the way for inner-party the previous interior minister Hans-Dietrich Genscher free.

From 1969 to 1974 the FDP supported the SPD Chancellor Willy Brandt, who was succeeded by Helmut Schmidt. Already by the end of the 70s there did not seem to be enough similarities between the FDP and the SPD to form a new coalition, but the CDU/CSU chancellor candidate of Franz Josef Strauss in 1980 pushed the parties to run together again. The FDP's policies, however, began to drift apart from the SPD's, especially when it came to the economy. Within the SPD, there was strong grassroots opposition to Chancellor Helmut Schmidt's policies on the NATO Double-Track Decision. However, within the FDP, the conflicts and contrasts were always greater.

1982–1998: Kohl government, economic transition and reunification 
In the fall of 1982, the FDP reneged on its coalition agreement with the SPD and instead threw its support behind the CDU/CSU. On 1 October, the FDP and CDU/CSU were able to oust Schmidt and replace him with CDU party chairman Helmut Kohl as the new Chancellor. The coalition change resulted in severe internal conflicts, and the FDP then lost about 20 percent of its 86,500 members, as reflected in the general election in 1983 by a drop from 10.6 percent to 7.0 percent. The members went mostly to the SPD, the Greens and newly formed splinter parties, such as the left-liberal party Liberal Democrats (LD). The exiting members included the former FDP General Secretary and later EU Commissioner Günter Verheugen. At the party convention in November 1982, the Schleswig-Holstein state chairman Uwe Ronneburger challenged Hans-Dietrich Genscher as party chairman. Ronneburger received 186 of the votes—about 40 percent—and was just narrowly defeated by Genscher.

in 1980, FDP members who did not agree with the politics of the FDP youth organization Young Democrats founded the Young Liberals (JuLis). For a time JuLis and the Young Democrats operated side by side, until the JuLis became the sole official youth wing of the FDP in 1983. The Young Democrats split from the FDP and were left as a party-independent youth organization.

At the time of reunification, the FDP's objective was a special economic zone in the former East Germany, but could not prevail against the CDU/CSU, as this would prevent any loss of votes in the five new federal states in the general election in 1990.

In all federal election campaigns since the 1980s, the party sided with the CDU and CSU, the main conservative parties in Germany.  Following German reunification in 1990, the FDP merged with the Association of Free Democrats, a grouping of liberals from East Germany and the Liberal Democratic Party of Germany.

During the political upheavals of 1989/1990 in the GDR new liberal parties emerged, like the FDP East Germany or the German Forum Party. They formed the Liberal Democratic Party, who had previously acted as a bloc party on the side of the SED and with Manfred Gerlach also the last Council of State of the GDR presented, the Alliance of Free Democrats (BFD). Within the FDP came in the following years to considerable internal discussions about dealing with the former bloc party. Even before the reunification of Germany united on a joint congress in Hanover, the West German FDP united with the other parties to form the first all-German party. Both party factions brought the FDP a great, albeit short-lived, increase in membership. In the first all-German Bundestag elections, the CDU/CSU/FDP centre-right coalition was confirmed, the FDP received 11.0 percent of the valid votes (79 seats) and won in Genschers city of birth Halle (Saale) the first direct mandate since 1957.

During the 1990s, the FDP won between 6.2 and 11 percent of the vote in Bundestag elections. It last participated in the federal government by representing the junior partner in the government of Chancellor Helmut Kohl of the CDU.

In 1998, the CDU/CSU-FDP coalition lost the federal election, which ended the FDP's nearly three decade reign in government. In its 2002 campaign the FDP made an exception to its party policy of siding with the CDU/CSU when it adopted equidistance to the CDU and SPD. From 1998 until 2009 the FDP remained in the opposition until it became part of a new centre-right coalition government.

2005 federal election 

In the 2005 general election the party won 9.8 percent of the vote and 61 federal deputies, an unpredicted improvement from prior opinion polls. It is believed that this was partly due to tactical voting by CDU and Christian Social Union of Bavaria (CSU) alliance supporters who hoped for stronger market-oriented economic reforms than the CDU/CSU alliance called for. However, because the CDU did worse than predicted, the FDP and the CDU/CSU alliance were unable to form a coalition government. At other times, for example after the 2002 federal election, a coalition between the FDP and CDU/CSU was impossible primarily because of the weak results of the FDP.

The CDU/CSU parties had achieved the third-worst performance in German postwar history with only 35.2 percent of the votes. Therefore, the FDP was unable to form a coalition with its preferred partners, the CDU/CSU parties. As a result, the party was considered as a potential member of two other political coalitions, following the election. One possibility was a partnership between the FDP, the Social Democratic Party of Germany (SPD) and the Alliance 90/The Greens, known as a "traffic light coalition", named after the colors of the three parties. This coalition was ruled out, because the FDP considered the Social Democrats and the Greens insufficiently committed to market-oriented economic reform. The other possibility was a CDU-FDP-Green coalition, known as a "Jamaica coalition" because of the colours of the three parties. This coalition wasn't concluded either, since the Greens ruled out participation in any coalition with the CDU/CSU. Instead, the CDU formed a Grand coalition with the SPD, and the FDP entered the opposition. FDP leader Guido Westerwelle became the unofficial leader of the opposition by virtue of the FDP's position as the largest opposition party in the Bundestag.

In the 2009 European election, the FDP received 11% of the national vote (2,888,084 votes in total) and returned 12 MEPs.

2009–2013: Merkel II government 

In the September 2009 federal elections, the FDP increased its share of the vote by 4.8 percentage points to 14.6%, an all-time record. This percentage was enough to offset a decline in the CDU/CSU's vote compared to 2005, to create a CDU-FDP centre-right governing coalition in the Bundestag with a 53% majority of seats.  On election night, party leader Westerwelle said his party would work to ensure that civil liberties were respected and that Germany got an "equitable tax system and better education opportunities".

The party also made gains in the two state elections held at the same time, acquiring sufficient seats for a CDU-FDP coalition in the northernmost state, Schleswig-Holstein, and gaining enough votes in left-leaning Brandenburg to clear the 5% hurdle to enter that state's parliament.

However, after reaching its best ever election result in 2009, the FDP's support collapsed. The party's policy pledges were put on hold by Merkel as the recession of 2009 unfolded and with the onset of the European debt crisis in 2010. By the end of 2010, the party's support had dropped to as low as 5%. The FDP retained their seats in the state elections in North Rhine-Westphalia, which was held six months after the federal election, but out of the seven state elections that have been held since 2009, the FDP have lost all their seats in five of them due to failing to cross the 5% threshold.

Support for the party further eroded amid infighting and an internal rebellion over euro-area bailouts during the debt crisis.

Westerwelle stepped down as party leader following the 2011 state elections, in which the party was wiped out in Saxony-Anhalt and Rhineland-Palatinate and lost half its seats in Baden-Württemberg. Westerwelle was replaced in May 2011 by Philipp Rösler. The change in leadership failed to revive the FDP's fortunes, however, and in the next series of state elections, the party lost all its seats in Bremen, Mecklenburg-Vorpommern, and Berlin. In Berlin, the party lost nearly 75% of the support they had had in the previous election.

In March 2012, the FDP lost all their state-level representation in the 2012 Saarland state election. However, this was offset by the Schleswig-Holstein state elections, when they achieved 8% of the vote, which was a severe loss of seats but still over the 5% threshold. In the snap elections in North Rhine-Westphalia a week later, the FDP not only crossed the electoral threshold, but also increased its share of the votes to 2 percentage points higher than in the previous state election. This was attributed to the local leadership of Christian Lindner.

2013 federal election 
The FDP last won a directly elected seat in 1990, in Halle—the only time it has won a directly elected seat since 1957. The party's inability to win directly elected seats came back to haunt it at the 2013 election, in which it came up just short of the 5% threshold. With no directly elected seats, the FDP was shut out of the Bundestag for the first time since 1949. After the previous chairman Philipp Rösler then resigned, Christian Lindner took over the leadership of the party.

2014 European and state elections 
In the 2014 European parliament elections, the FDP received 3.4% of the national vote (986,253 votes in total) and returned 3 MEPs. In the 2014 Brandenburg state election the party experienced a 5.8% down-swing and lost all their representatives in the Brandenburg state parliament. In the 2014 Saxony state election, the party experienced a 5.2% down-swing, again losing all of its seats. In the 2014 Thuringian state election a similar phenomenon was repeated with the party falling below the 5% threshold following a 5.1% drop in popular vote.

2015–2020 
The party managed to enter parliament in the 2015 Bremen state election with the party receiving 6.5% of the vote and gaining 6 seats. However, it failed to get into government as a coalition between the Social Democrats and the Greens was created. In the 2016 Mecklenburg-Vorpommern state election the party failed to get into parliament despite increasing its vote share by 0.3%. The party did manage to get into parliament in Baden-Württemberg, gaining 3% of the vote and a total of 12 seats. This represents a five-seat improvement over their previous results. In the 2016 Berlin state election the party gained 4.9% of the vote and 12 seats but still failed to get into government. A red-red-green coalition was instead formed relegating the FDP to the opposition. In the 2016 Rhineland-Palatinate state election, the party managed to enter parliament receiving 6.2% of the vote and 7 seats. It also managed to enter government under a traffic light coalition. In 2016 Saxony-Anhalt state election the party narrowly missed the 5% threshold, receiving 4.9% of the vote and therefore receiving zero seats despite a 1% swing in their favour.

The 2017 North Rhine-Westphalia state election was widely considered a test of the party's future as their chairman Christian Lindner was also leading the party in that state. The party experienced a 4% swing in its favour gaining 6 seats and entering into a coalition with the CDU with a bare majority. In the 2017 Saarland state election the party again failed to gain any seats despite a 1% swing in their favour. The party gained 3 seats and increased its vote share by 3.2% in the 2017 Schleswig-Holstein state election. This success was often credited to their state chairman Wolfgang Kubicki. They also managed to re-enter the government under a Jamaica coalition.

In the 2017 federal election the party scored 10.7% of votes and re-entered the Bundestag, winning 80 seats. After the election, a Jamaica coalition was considered between the CDU, Greens, and FDP. However, FDP chief Christian Lindner walked out of the coalition talks due to a disagreement over European migration policy, saying "It is better not to govern than to govern badly." As a result, the CDU/CSU formed another grand coalition with the SPD.

The FDP won 5.4% and 5 seats in the 2019 European election.

In the October 2019 Thuringian state election, the FDP won seats in the Landtag of Thuringia for the first time since 2009. It exceeded the 5% threshold by just 5 votes. In February 2020, the FDP's Thomas Kemmerich was elected Minister-President of Thuringia by the Landtag with the likely support of the CDU and AfD, becoming the second member of the FDP to serve as head of government in a German state. This was also the first time a head of government had been elected with the support of AfD. Under intense pressure from state and federal politicians, Kemmerich resigned the following day, stating he would seek new elections. The next month, he was replaced by Bodo Ramelow of The Left; the FDP did not run a candidate in the second vote for Minister-President.

2021–present 
In 2021, the FDP returned to the Saxony-Anhalt state parliament after five years of absence. They had similar success in Baden-Württemberg and Mecklenburg-Vorpommern, but faced setbacks in Baden-Württemberg, Berlin and Rhineland-Palatinate.

In the September 2021 federal election, the FDP saw its vote share and number of seats grow, to 11.5% and 92 seats respectively. As a result of the defeat of the CDU/CSU under Armin Laschet, the SPD, Greens, and FDP entered talks to form a traffic light coalition. The agreement was finalised on 24 November, in which the FDP holds four federal ministries in the Scholz cabinet (Finance, Justice, Digital and Transport and Education and Research.

Throughout 2022, the FDP saw poor approval in national opinion polls. In State Parliament elections they also performed poorly. In March, the FDP didn't win any seats in Saarland. In May they lost over half their seats in many seats in North Rhine-Westphalia and Schleswig-Holstein. In October, the FDP lost all 11 of their seats in Lower Saxony. It also lost all 12 seats in the 2023 Berlin repeat state election.

Ideology and policies 

The FDP has been described as liberal, conservative-liberal, classical-liberal, and liberal-conservative. The FDP's political position is described as centrist, centre-right, and right-wing.

The FDP is a predominantly classical-liberal party, both in the sense of supporting free market economic policies and in the sense of policies emphasizing the minimization of government interference in individual affairs. The party has also been described as neoliberal. Scholars of political science have historically identified the FDP as closer to the CDU/CSU bloc than to the Social Democratic Party of Germany (SPD) on economic issues but closer to the SPD and the Greens on issues such as civil liberties, education, defense, and foreign policy.

Due to the FDP's culturally and economically liberal position, it is considered more centrist than Christian-based centre-right conservative CDU. The FDP itself has been oriented towards a centrist position between the CDU and the SPD.  Voters in the FDP and the Greens have something in common: younger, politically centrist professionals living in cities, unlike left working-class voters and right Christian voters.

In 1971 during its social-liberal coalition with the SPD, the FDP published the "Freiberg Thesis" programme, heralding an ideological move towards a reformism and social liberalism, and support for environmental protection. However, the party's 1977 Kiel Theses and 1985 "Liberal Manifesto" returned the FDP towards a free-market, ordoliberal approach.

During the 2017 federal election, the party called for Germany to adopt an immigration channel using a Canada-style points-based immigration system; spend up to 3% of GDP on defense and international security; phase out the solidarity surcharge tax (which was first levied in 1991 to pay for the costs of absorbing East Germany after German reunification); cut taxes by 30 billion euro (twice the amount of the tax cut proposed by the CDU); and improve road infrastructure by spending 2 billion euro annually for each of the next two decades, to be funded by selling government stakes in Deutsche Bahn, Deutsche Telekom, and Deutsche Post. The FDP also called for the improvement of Germany's digital infrastructure, the establishment of a Ministry of Digital Affairs, and greater investment in education. The party also supports allowing dual citizenship (in contrast to the CDU/CSU, which opposes it) but also supports requiring third-generation immigrants to select a single nationality.

The FDP supports the legalization of cannabis in Germany and opposes proposals to heighten Internet surveillance. The FDP supports same-sex marriage in Germany.

The FDP has mixed views on European integration. In its 2009 campaign manifesto, the FDP pledged support for ratification of the Lisbon Treaty as well as EU reforms aimed at enhancing transparency and democratic responsiveness, reducing bureaucracy, establishing stringent curbs on the EU budget, and fully liberalizing the Single Market. At its January 2019 congress ahead of the 2019 European Parliament election, FDP's manifesto called for further EU reforms, including reducing the number of European Commissioners to 18 from the current 28, abolishing the European Economic and Social Committee, and ending the European Parliament's "traveling circus" between Brussels and Strasbourg. Vice chairwoman and Deputy Leader Nicola Beer stated: "We want both more and less Europe."

Support base
The party tends to draw its support from professionals and self-employed Germans. It lacks consistent support from a voting bloc, such as the trade union membership that supports the SPD or the church membership that supports the CDU/CSU, and thus has historically only garnered a small group of Stammwähler (core voters) who consistently vote for the party.

In the 2021 elections, the FDP was the second-most popular party among voters under age 30; among this demographic, the Greens won 22% of the vote, the FDP 19%, the SPD 17%, the CDU/CSU 11%, Die Linke 8%, and the AfD 8%.

In 1940s and 1950s, the FDP was the only German party strongly in favour of market economy, while the CDU/CSU was still adhering to a "third way" between capitalism and socialism. At the time, the FDP wanted former Nazis to be reintegrated into society and demanded a release of Nazi war criminals.

The party's membership has historically been largely male; in 1995, less than one-third of the party's members were women, and in the 1980s women made up less than one-tenth of the party's national executive committee. By the 1990s, the percentage of women on the FDP's national executive committee rose to 20%.

European representation 
In the European Parliament the Free Democratic Party sits in the Renew Europe group with five MEPs.

In the European Committee of the Regions, the Free Democratic Party sits in the Renew Europe CoR group, with one full member for the 2020–2025 mandate.

Election results

Federal Parliament (Bundestag) 
Below are charts of the results that the FDP has secured in each election to the federal Bundestag. Timelines showing the number of seats and percentage of party list votes won are on the right.

European Parliament

State Parliaments

Results timeline

Leadership

Leader of the FDP

Leader of the FDP in the Bundestag

See also 
 Federal Association of Liberal Students Groups
 Franz Xaver Kappus
 Liberalism in Germany
 List of political parties in Germany
 Politics of Germany

Notes

Citations

References

External links 
 
 
 Electoral Platform/Manifesto of the FDP for the 2013 federal elections  (English)

 
Alliance of Liberals and Democrats for Europe Party member parties
Centrist parties in Germany
Centre-right parties in Europe
Classical liberal parties
Conservative liberal parties
Liberal International
Liberal parties in Germany
Neoliberal parties
Political parties established in 1948
Parties represented in the European Parliament
1948 establishments in Germany